Unapdev (25 km from Chopda) is  in Shahada, Dist. Nandurbar, Maharashtra tahsil located near the village Dara. It has a permanent natural hot water source. 

Unapdev (25 km from Shāhāda) is a picnic point in Shahada, Maharashtra tehsil located near Dara Village. It has a permanent natural hot water source, which always flows even in hot summers. It always has water coming from a structure in the shape like a cow's mouth.

Approach 
Unapdev is about 24 km from Shahada, a city in Maharashtra, which is about 240 km from Nashik and about 200 km from Surat. The nearest railway station is Nandurbar, which is about 40 km and Dondaicha, which is about 35 km from Shahada, Maharashtra. However, for approach from Mumbai (445 km), the train station to approach is Dhule (90 km) or Chalisgaon (145 km). The nearest airport is Aurangabad (290 km) and Jalgaon (160 km).

References

Hill stations in Maharashtra
Tourist attractions in Nandurbar district
Hot springs of India